Ralph is an unincorporated community in Harding County, South Dakota, United States. Although not tracked by the Census Bureau, Ralph has been assigned the ZIP code of 57650.

The community was named for James Ralph Howard, the original owner of the town site.

References

Unincorporated communities in Harding County, South Dakota
Unincorporated communities in South Dakota